The Connecticut March is a song originally from 1911, written by William Nassann.  It was republished in 1913 and published again by Paull-Pioneer Music in 1938.

References

Bibliography
Burkholder, J. Peter. All Made of Tunes: Charles Ives and the Uses of Musical Borrowing. New Haven: Yale University Press, 1995. 
Yankee. Dublin, N.H.: Yankee, 1935- , Vol. 43, page 175.

1911 songs
Connecticut culture
Songs of World War I
Songs of World War II
March music